Zhang Yinuo (Chinese: 张一诺; Pinyin: Zhāng Yīnuò; born 14 July 1994) is a Chinese football player who currently plays for Chengdu Rongcheng as a goalkeeper.

Club career
Zhang Yinuo joined Chengdu Blades youth team system from Chengdu Football Association in 2011. He was promoted to Chengdu Blades's first team squad in 2013. On 21 September 2013, Zhang made his senior debut in a 2–0 league victory against Yanbian Changbai Tiger. He became the first choice goalkeeper after his debut, playing all matches for the remainder of the season. He kept his regular position and made 28 appearances in the 2014 league season.

On 9 February 2015, Zhang transferred to Chinese Super League side Shanghai Shenxin after Chengdu were relegated and dissolved. He made his Super League debut on 18 April 2015 in a 4–1 home defeat against Changchun Yatai. At the end of the league campaign Shanghai Shenxin were relegated. Zhang remained with the club, however he would lose his place as first choice goalkeeper to Zhang Xunwei and then Guo Wei before leaving the club to join fellow League One side Shijiazhuang Ever Bright on 9 February 2018.

After playing understudy to Shao Puliang at Shijiazhuang Ever Bright, Zhang joined another second tier club in Chengdu Rongcheng. He would go on to make his debut for the club in a league game on 12 September 2020 against Beijing Renhe, which ended in a 3-2 victory. The following season he would establish himself as a vital member within the team and aid them to promotion to the top tier at the end of the 2021 league campaign.

Career statistics 
Statistics accurate as of match played 31 December 2021.

References

External links
 

1994 births
Living people
Chinese footballers
People from Dazhou
Footballers from Sichuan
Shanghai Shenxin F.C. players
Chengdu Tiancheng F.C. players
Cangzhou Mighty Lions F.C. players
Chengdu Better City F.C. players
China League One players
Chinese Super League players
Association football goalkeepers